The Secretary of Sports and Recreation of Puerto Rico is responsible for the development and management of all matters related to sports and recreation in the government of Puerto Rico. The Secretary heads the Department of Sports and Recreation.

Secretaries

Council of Secretaries of Puerto Rico